The action of 26 April 1944 occurred as a part of Operation Tunnel, Allied destroyer sweeps of the coast of Brittany in preparation for Operation Overlord. Both of the other torpedo boats were damaged in the engagement. T29 caused some casualties on Haida and Huron before sinking with a loss of 135 men. Haida and Ashanti collided with each other near the end of the action.

References

Further reading

External links
 Report of the action at hmcshaida.ca

Naval battles of World War II involving Canada
A
Naval battles of World War II involving Germany
April 1944 events
Military history of the English Channel